Mary Sally Home (27 September 1930 – 3 March 1992), born in Southsea, was a British actress whose career encompassed stage, television and radio.

Life and career
Her stage roles included Carla in Robert Muller's Night Conspirators, alongside Peter Wyngarde, both on television and the subsequent stage play in the West End and on tour. In 1965 she appeared in Anouilh's The Cavern (La grotte) in London, alongside Alec McCowen, Griffith Jones, Geoffrey Bayldon, and Siobhan McKenna, and in 1971 in Noël Coward's Tonight at 8.30 with Millicent Martin.

On the radio she played Claire Nash in the BBC Radio 2 soap opera Waggoners' Walk NW.

Home took a variety of parts in television productions from the 1960s, mainly straight drama but also comedy. In a 1969 BBC TV adaptation of Dickens' Dombey and Son she took the dual roles, of the haughty and tragic Edith Dombey (Granger) and of her cousin the vengeful Alice Marwood.

Personal life
Home met George Baker when they appeared together in the television series Rupert of Hentzau in 1964 and they married ten years later. They had one daughter.

Television appearances

1960	Aren't We All? (Hon. Mrs W Tatham) BBC TV
1960	The Fanatics (Gwen Freeman) BBC TV
1961	The Weasel	
1962	Charley was my darling (Barbara Willow) BBC
1963	The Teachers (Kathie Elliot) Associated-Rediffusion 
1963	Julius Caesar (Portia) BBC (Shakespeare)
1964	Rupert of Hentzau (Helga von Tarlenheim) BBC (sequel to The Prisoner of Zenda)
1964	A Danger to Others (Julie Lamotte) Rediffusion
1967	Witch Hunt (Maggie Lowther) BBC2 series
1967	The Moon and Sixpence (Amy Strickland) BBC
1969	Dombey and Son (Edith Dombey (Granger)/Alice Marwood) BBC TV serialisation of Dickens novel
1972	New Scotland Yard (Angela Kingdom) LWT series 2 episode 7 'Papa Charlie'
1972	The Fenn Street Gang (staff nurse) LWT series 1 episode 20 'Who's Minding the Shop?'; series 2 episode 7 'The Lady with the Lamp'; LWT  series 2 episode 14 'Dypsomania on Sea'
1973	New Scotland Yard (Angela Kingdom) LWT series 3 episode 11 'Monopoly'
1974	Death or Glory Boy (Lady Otley) Yorkshire TV – episode 'Early Breakfast'
1975	Nightingale's Boys (Brenda Cartwright) Granada series 'A.J.'
1975 	Sam and the River (Mrs Redmond) BBC
1977	Marie Curie (Henriette Perrin) BBC TV series
1977	Wings (Hon Evelyn Gaylion) BBC TV series series 1 episode 9 'New Deal'; series 2 episode 4 'Transfer'
1979	BBC Television Shakespeare: Henry VIII (Patience) BBC
1980	Holding the Fort (Lt. Col. Featherstonehaugh) LWT situation comedy - episode 'Jumping the Gun'
1983	Fräulein Elsa (cast) BBC play
1984	Data Protection, The Law and You (cast) Video Arts
1987	Suspicion (Mrs Barham) HTV (based on Hitchcock)
1991	Deptford Graffiti (Mrs G.) Channel 4

References

1930 births
1992 deaths
British stage actresses
British television actresses
20th-century English actresses
People from Southsea